This list of the prehistoric life of South Dakota contains the various prehistoric life-forms whose fossilized remains have been reported from within the US state of South Dakota.

Precambrian
The Paleobiology Database records no known occurrences of Precambrian fossils in Alabama.

Paleozoic

 †Acrotreta
 †Agnostogonus
 †Agnostogonus incognitus – or unidentified comparable form
   †Agnostus
 †Amiaspis
 †Amiaspis erratica
 †Ankoura
 †Ankoura triangularis
 †Ankoura triangularus
 †Aphelaspis
 †Aphelaspis haguei
 †Arapahoia
 †Arapahoia spathulata
 †Arapahoia spatulata
 †Arcifimbria
 †Arcifimbria pahasapaensis
 †Arcifimbrin
 †Arcifimbrin pahasapaensis
 †Arcuolimbus
 †Arcuolimbus convexus
 †Billingsella
 †Billingsella wichitaensis
 †Blountia
 †Blountia arcuosa
 †Blountia arion
 †Blountia bristolensis
 †Blountia eleanora
 †Blountia janei
 †Blountia nixonensis
 †Blountiella
 †Blountiella alberta
 †Blountiella cordilleria
 †Briscoia
 †Briscoia angustilimba – or unidentified comparable form
 †Briscoia dalyi
 †Bynumia
 †Bynumia eumus
 †Bynumina
 †Camaraspis
  †Caseodus
 †Caseodus eatoni – or unidentified related form
  †Cedaria
 †Cedarina
 †Cedarina cordillerae
 †Cedarina dakotaensis
 †Cedarina dakotensis
 †Cheilocephalus
 †Cheilocephalus brevilobus
  †Cladodus – or unidentified comparable form
 †Clelandia
 †Clelandia typicalis
 †Coosella
 †Coosella onusta
 †Coosella perplexa
 †Coosella prolifica
 †Coosia
 †Coosia albertensis
 †Coosia alethes
 †Coosina
 †Coosina ariston
 †Crepicephalus
 †Crepicephalus auratus
 †Crepicephalus buttsimontanaenis
 †Crepicephalus buttsimontanaensis
 †Crepicephalus buttsimotanaensis
 †Crepicephalus deadwoodensis
 †Crepicephalus rectus
 †Crepicephalus snowyenis
 †Crepicephalus snowyensis
 †Cyclendoceras
 †Cyrtogomphoceras
 †Dartonaspis
 †Dartonaspis wichitaensis
 †Dartonaspis witchitaensis
 †Deadwoodia
 †Dicellomus
 †Diestoceras
  †Dikelocephalus
 †Dikelocephalus minnesotensis
 †Dresbachia
 †Dresbachia amata
  †Edestus
 †Ellipsocephaloides
 †Ellipsocephaloides curtus
 †Ellipsocephaloides monensis
 †Ellipsocephaloides monsensis
  †Endoceras
 †Eoorthis
 †Eoorthis indianola
 †Eoorthis remnicha
 †Ephippiorthoceras
 †Glaphyraspis
 †Glaphyraspis newtoni
 †Glaphyraspis parva
 †Hadragnostus
 †Hadragnostus modestus
 †Hardyoides
 †Hardyoides tenerus
 †Holmesella
 †Holmesella quadrata
 †Homagnostus
 †Homagnostus obesus
  †Hyolithes
 †Hysteropleura
 †Hysteropleura schucherti
 †Idahoia
 †Idahoia serapio
 †Idahoia wisconsensis
 †Idiomesus
 †Idiomesus granti
 †Idiomesus infimus
 †Illaenurus
 †Illaenurus priscus
  †Janassa
 †Kingstonia
 †Kingstonia bealesoides
 †Kingstonia scrinium
 †Kingstonia spicata
 †Kingstonia spicta
 †Kingstonia walcotti
 †Kingstonia walcottia
 †Komaspidella
 †Komaspidella hata
 †Komaspidella lata
 †Kormagnostus
 †Kormagnostus beltensis
 †Kormagnostus seclusus
 †Lambeoceras – tentative report
 †Lingulella
 †Lingulepis
 †Linnarssonella
  †Listracanthus
 †Listracanthus hystrix
 †Litagnostus
 †Litagnostus paralis
 †Llanoaspis
 †Llanoaspis undulata
 †Meniscocorypphe
 †Meniscocorypphe platycephala
 †Menomonia
 †Menomonia prooculis
  †Meteoraspis
 †Meteoraspis keeganensis
 †Meteoraspis metra
 †Meteoraspis robusta
 †Modocia
 †Modocia centralis
 †Modocia oweni
 †Monocheilus
 †Monocheilus micros
 †Monocheilus truncatus
 †Nahannagnostus
 †Nahannagnostus nganasanicus
 †Nahannagnostus nganasanious
 †Parabolinoides
 †Parabolinoides contractus
 †Parabolinoides granulosus
 †Pemphigaspis
 †Pemphigaspis bullata
 †Petrodus
 †Petrodus patelliformis
 †Plethopeltis
 †Prosaukia
 †Prosaukia misa
 †Pseudagnostus
 †Pseudagnostus douvillei
 †Pseudagnostus josephus
 †Ptchaspis
 †Ptchaspis striata
 †Ptychaspis
 †Ptychaspis bullasa
 †Ptychaspis miniscaensis
 †Ptychopleurites
 †Ptychopleurites spinosa
 †Pugionicauda
 †Pugionicauda paradoxa
 †Rasettia
 †Rasettia capax
 †Rasettia magna
  †Saukiella
 †Saukiella pyrene
 †Spyroceras
 †Syspacheilus
 †Taenicephalus
 †Taenicephalus nasutus
 †Taenicephalus shumardi
 †Terranovella
 †Terranovella dorsalis
  †Tricrepicephalus
 †Tricrepicephalus conia
 †Tricrepicephalus coria
 †Tricrepicephalus metra
 †Tricrepicephalus tripunctatus
 †Tripteroceras
 †Uncaspis
 †Uncaspis limbata
 †Uncaspis unca
 †Welleraspis
 †Welleraspis group#1 – informal
 †Welleraspis group#2 – informal
 †Westonoceras
 †Wilsonoceras
 †Winnipegoceras

Mesozoic

Selected Mesozoic taxa of South Dakota

 Acipenser – or unidentified comparable form
 †Actinocamax
 †Adocus
 †Agerostrea
  †Allosaurus
  †Alphadon
 †Alphadon marshi
 †Anatotitan
 †Anatotitan copei
 †Anomia
 †Anzu – type locality for genus
 †Anzu wyliei – type locality for species
 †Apatosaurus
 †Araucarioxylon
  †Archelon – type locality for genus
 †Archelon ischyros – type locality for species
 †Artocarpus – report made of unidentified related form or using admittedly obsolete nomenclature
 Aspideretes
 †Asplenium
  †Baculites
 †Baculites clinolobatus
 †Baculites compressus
 †Baculites grandis
 †Baculites larsoni
 †Baculites ovatus
 †Baculites yokoyamai
 †Bananogmius
 †Baptornis
 †Baptornis varneri – type locality for species
  †Barosaurus – type locality for genus
 †Barosaurus lentus – type locality for species
 †Basilemys
 †Belemnitella
 †Belemnitella bulbosa
 Beryx – or unidentified related form
 †Bolodon
 †Bolodon hydei – type locality for species
 †Borealosuchus
 †Borealosuchus sternbergii
 Brachidontes
  †Brachychampsa
 †Brachychampsa montana
 †Brodavis
 †Brodavis baileyi – type locality for species
 †Caenagnathus
 †Calycoceras
 †Calycoceras boreale – type locality for species
 †Calycoceras dromense – or unidentified comparable form
  †Camarasaurus
 Campeloma
 †Caturus
 †Champsosaurus
 †Cimexomys
 †Cimolodon
 †Cimolodon nitidus
  †Cimolomys
 †Cimolomys gracilis
 †Claosaurus
 †Claosaurus affinis – type locality for species
 †Clidastes
 †Clidastes propython
 †Cocculus
  †Collignoniceras
 †Collignoniceras collisniger – type locality for species
 †Collignoniceras jorgenseni – type locality for species
 †Collignoniceras percarinatum
 †Collignoniceras praecox
 †Collignoniceras vermilionense
 †Collignoniceras woolgari
 †Collignoniceras woollgari
 †Compsemys
 Corbula
 †Corbulamella
 †Crenella
 †Crenella elegantula
  †Cretolamna
 †Cretolamna appendiculata
 †Cteniogenys
 Cucullaea
 †Cuspidaria
  †Cycadeoidea
 †Cycadeoidea aspera – type locality for species
 †Cycadeoidea cicatricula – type locality for species
 †Cycadeoidea colei – type locality for species
 †Cycadeoidea colossalis – type locality for species
 †Cycadeoidea dacotensis
 †Cycadeoidea excelsa – type locality for species
 †Cycadeoidea formosa – type locality for species
 †Cycadeoidea furcata – type locality for species
 †Cycadeoidea ingens – type locality for species
 †Cycadeoidea insolita – type locality for species
 †Cycadeoidea jenneyana
 †Cycadeoidea Jenneyana
 †Cycadeoidea marshiana – type locality for species
 †Cycadeoidea mcbridei – type locality for species
 †Cycadeoidea McBridei – type locality for species
 †Cycadeoidea minnekahtensis – type locality for species
 †Cycadeoidea nana – type locality for species
 †Cycadeoidea occidentalis – type locality for species
 †Cycadeoidea paynei – type locality for species
 †Cycadeoidea pulcherrima – type locality for species
 †Cycadeoidea stillwelli – type locality for species
 †Cycadeoidea turrita – type locality for species
 †Cycadeoidea Wellsii – type locality for species
 †Dakotadon
 †Dakotadon lakotaensis
  †Dakotaraptor – type locality for genus
 †Dakotaraptor steini – type locality for species
 †Desmatochelys
 †Didelphodon
  †Diplodocus
 †Discoscaphites
 †Discoscaphites conradi
 †Discoscaphites gulosus
 †Discoscaphites rossi – type locality for species
 †Dolichorhynchops
 †Dolichorhynchops bonneri
 †Dolichorhynchops osborni
 †Edmontonia
 †Edmontonia longiceps
  †Edmontosaurus
  †Elasmosaurus
 †Elasmosaurus intermedius – type locality for species
 †Enchodus
 †Eubostrychoceras
 †Eucalycoceras
 †Eutrephoceras
 †Geosternbergia
 †Geosternbergia maiseyi – type locality for species
 Gleichenia
  †Globidens
 †Globidens alabamensis
 †Globidens dakotensis – type locality for species
 †Globidens schurmanni – type locality for species
 †Glyptops
 Glyptostrobus
 †Glyptostrobus europaeus
 †Gorgosaurus
 †Hainosaurus
 †Hamites
  †Hesperornis
 †Hesperornis regalis – or unidentified comparable form
 Hiatella – tentative report
 †Hoplitosaurus
 †Hoplitosaurus marshi – type locality for species
 †Hoploparia
 †Hoploscaphites
 †Hoploscaphites comprimus
 †Hoploscaphites melloi – type locality for species
 †Hoploscaphites nicolletii
 †Hulettia
 †Hypsilophodon
 †Hypsilophodon wielandi – type locality for species
  †Ichthyodectes
  †Inoceramus
 †Inoceramus apicalis
 †Inoceramus ginterensis
 †Inoceramus tenuis – or unidentified related form
 †Inoceramus tenuistriatus – tentative report
 †Ischyodus
 †Ischyodus rayhaasi
 Isurus
  †Jeletzkytes
 †Jeletzkytes dorfi
 †Jeletzkytes nebrascensis
 †Jeletzkytes spedeni – type locality for species
 Lamna
  †Leidyosuchus
 †Lemnaceae
 †Lepidotes – tentative report
 Lepisosteus
 †Leptalestes
 †Leptalestes cooki
 †Leptalestes krejcii
 †Lucina – tentative report
 †Melvius
  †Meniscoessus
 †Meniscoessus robustus
 †Mesodma
 †Mesodma formosa
 †Mesodma hensleighi
 †Mesodma thompsoni
 †Modiolus
  †Mosasaurus
 †Mosasaurus missouriensis – type locality for species
 †Myledaphus
 †Myledaphus bipartitus
 †Nelumbo
 †Neocardioceras
 †Neocardioceras transiens – type locality for species
 Nucula
 †Nucula percrassa
 †Ophiomorpha
  †Ornithomimus
 †Osmakasaurus
 †Osmakasaurus depressus – type locality for species
 Ostrea
 †Otoscaphites
 †Oxytoma
  †Pachycephalosaurus – type locality for genus
 †Pachycephalosaurus wyomingensis – type locality for species
 †Pachyrhizodus
 †Pahasapasaurus – type locality for genus
 †Pahasapasaurus haasi – type locality for species
  †Palmoxylon
 Panopea
 †Paronychodon
 †Paronychodon lacustris
 Pholadomya
 †Pistia – report made of unidentified related form or using admittedly obsolete nomenclature
 †Placenticeras
 †Placenticeras pseudoplacenta
 Platanus
  †Platecarpus
 †Platecarpus somenensis – or unidentified comparable form
 †Platecarpus tympaniticus
 †Plesiobaena
 †Plioplatecarpus
 †Plioplatecarpus primaevus – type locality for species
 †Prognathodon
 †Prognathodon overtoni – type locality for species
 †Proplacenticeras
 †Protocardia
 †Protosphyraena
 †Protostega
  †Pteranodon
 †Pteranodon longiceps
 †Ptychodus
 †Ptychodus occidentalis
 Quercus
 †Rhamnus
  †Richardoestesia
 †Richardoestesia isosceles
 Sassafras
 †Scaphites
 †Sequoia
 Solemya
 Sphaerium
 †Sphenobaiera
 †Sphenodiscus
 †Sphenodiscus beecheri – tentative report
 †Sphenodiscus lobatus
 †Sphenodiscus pleurisepta
  Squalicorax
 †Squalicorax falcatus
 Squalus
  †Styxosaurus
 †Styxosaurus browni
 †Styxosaurus snowii – type locality for species
 †Tatankaceratops – type locality for genus
 †Tatankaceratops sacrisonorum – type locality for species
 Taxodium
 †Thescelosaurus
 †Thescelosaurus neglectus
 †Thespesius – type locality for genus
 †Thespesius occidentalis – type locality for species
 †Torosaurus
 †Torosaurus latus
  †Toxochelys
 †Toxochelys latiremis
 †Trachodon
 †Tragodesmoceras
 †Tragodesmoceras carlilense
 †Tragodesmoceras carlilensis
  †Triceratops
 †Triceratops horridus
 †Tylosaurus
 †Tylosaurus proriger
  †Tyrannosaurus
 †Tyrannosaurus rex
 Viviparus
 †Yezoites
 Yoldia
 Ziziphus

Cenozoic

Selected Cenozoic taxa of South Dakota

 †Aelurodon
  †Aepycamelus
 †Agnotocastor
 †Agriochoerus
 Alligator
 †Alligator prenasalis – type locality for species
 †Ambystoma
 †Ambystoma tigrinum
  †Amebelodon
 †Ampelopsis
 †Amphechinus
 †Anchitherium
 Antilocapra
 †Antilocapra americana
 Apalone
 †Aphelops
 †Archaeocyon
 †Archaeohippus
 †Archaeotherium
 †Arctodus
 †Arctodus simus
 †Arctonasua
 Azolla
  †Barbourofelis
 †Barbourofelis whitfordi
 †Bathornis
 †Bathornis veredus
 Bison
  †Bison latifrons
 Blarina
 †Blarina carolinensis – or unidentified comparable form
 †Bothriodon
 †Brachypsalis
 †Brachyrhynchocyon
 †Brontops
 Bufo
 †Bufo woodhousei
 Buteo
 †Calippus
 †Camelops
 Canis
  †Canis dirus – or unidentified comparable form
 †Canis latrans
 †Canis lupus
 †Carpocyon
 Castor
 †Castor canadensis – or unidentified comparable form
 †Catostomus
 Celtis
 Cercidiphyllum
 Charina
 Chrysemys
 Cnemidophorus
 †Colodon
  †Cormocyon
 †Cormohipparion
  †Cosoryx
 †Cosoryx furcatus
 †Cranioceras
 Crotalus
 †Cynarctoides
 †Cynarctoides acridens
 †Cynarctoides lemur
 †Cynarctoides roii
 †Cynarctus
 †Cynodesmus
 Cynomys
  †Daphoenus
 †Desmatippus
 †Desmatochoerus
 †Desmocyon
 †Diceratherium
  †Dinictis
 †Dinohyus
 †Dipoides
 †Domnina
 †Duchesnehippus
 †Duchesneodus
 †Ectopocynus
 †Ekgmowechashala
 †Ekgmowechashala philotau – type locality for species
 Elaphe
 †Elaphe vulpina
 †Elomeryx
 †Enhydrocyon
  †Entelodon
 †Eopelobates
 †Epicyon
 Equus
 †Equus francisci
 †Equus giganteus – or unidentified comparable form
 †Etheostoma
  †Eubelodon
 †Eucastor
 †Eucommia
 Eumeces
 †Eumeces septentrionalis
 †Eusmilus
 Ficus
 Geomys
 †Gigantocamelus
  Glyptostrobus
  †Gomphotherium
 Graptemys
  †Hemiauchenia
 †Hemicyon
 †Herpetotherium
 †Herpetotherium fugax
 †Hesperocyon
 †Hesperotestudo
 Heterodon
 †Heteromeryx
 †Hipparion
 †Hippotherium
  †Homotherium – or unidentified comparable form
 †Hoplophoneus
  †Hyaenodon
 †Hyaenodon crucians
 †Hyaenodon horridus
 †Hyaenodon montanus – or unidentified comparable form
 †Hyaenodon mustelinus – type locality for species
 Hyla
 †Hypertragulus
 †Hypisodus
  †Hypohippus
 †Hypolagus
 †Hyporhina – type locality for genus
 †Hyporhina antiqua – type locality for species
  †Hyracodon
 Ictalurus
 †Ischyrocyon
 †Ischyromys
 †Lambdoceras
 Lampropeltis
 Lepisosteus
 Lepomis
 †Leptauchenia
 †Leptictis
  †Leptocyon
 †Leptomeryx
 Lepus
 †Lepus americanus – or unidentified comparable form
 †Longirostromeryx
 †Macrorhineura – type locality for genus
 †Macrorhineura skinneri – type locality for species
 †Mammacyon
 †Mammuthus
  †Mammuthus columbi
 Martes
 †Megacerops
 †Megachoerus – tentative report
 †Megaleptictis
 †Megaleptictis altidens
 †Megalictis
 †Megalictis ferox – type locality for species
 †Megalonyx
  †Megalonyx leptostomus
 †Megalonyx wheatleyi
 †Megapaloelodus – type locality for genus
  †Menoceras
 †Menops
 †Merychippus
  †Merychyus
 †Merycochoerus
 †Merycodus
 †Merycoides
 †Merycoidodon
 †Mesocyon
 †Mesohippus
 †Mesoreodon
  †Metamynodon
 †Metamynodon planifrons
 †Michenia
 Microtus
 †Miniochoerus
 †Miohippus
 †Miohippus grandis
 †Monosaulax
  †Moropus
 Mustela
 †Mylagaulus
 †Nannippus
 †Nanotragulus
 †Neohipparion – type locality for genus
 Neotoma
 Nerodia
 †Nerodia sipedon
 †Nexuotapirus
 †Niglarodon
  †Nimravus
 Notophthalmus
 †Nototamias
 †Notropis
 †Noturus – tentative report
 Ondatra
 Onychomys
 †Oreodontoides
 Ortalis
 †Osbornodon
 †Otarocyon
 †Oxetocyon
 †Oxydactylus
   †Palaeocastor
 †Palaeogale
 †Palaeolagus
 †Paracrax
 †Paradaphoenus
 †Paraenhydrocyon
 †Parahippus
 †Paramys
 †Paratomarctus
 †Paratylopus
 †Parictis
  †Peltosaurus
 †Peltosaurus granulosus
 †Peraceras
 Perognathus
 Peromyscus
 †Philotrox
 †Philotrox condoni
 †Phlaocyon
 †Phlaocyon minor
 Phrynosoma
 †Phrynosoma douglassi
 †Planera
 †Platygonus
 †Pliauchenia
 †Pliohippus
  †Poebrotherium
 †Pogonodon
 †Procamelus
 †Procastoroides
 †Promartes
 †Promerycochoerus
 †Proscalops
  †Protapirus
 †Proterix
 †Protoceras
 †Protohippus
 †Protolabis
 Pseudacris
  †Pseudaelurus
 †Pseudhipparion
 †Pseudoprotoceras
 Querquedula
 †Rana
 †Rana catesbeiana
 †Rana pipiens
 Reithrodontomys
 Rhineura
 Salvadora
 Scaphiopus
 †Sespia
 Sorex
 †Sorex cinereus
 Spea
 Spermophilus
  †Stegomastodon
 †Stegomastodon mirificus
 †Steneofiber
 Strix
  †Stylemys
 †Subhyracodon
 †Sunkahetanka
 †Sunkahetanka geringensis
 Sylvilagus
 †Sylvilagus floridanus
 Tapirus
  †Teleoceras
 †Teleoceras major
 Thamnophis
 †Thamnophis sirtalis
 Thomomys
  †Titanotylopus
 †Trigenicus
 †Trigonias
 Tympanuchus
 †Ursavus
 †Ustatochoerus
 Zapus
 Zelkova

References

 

South Dakota